Soulmates is a 1997 American drama film written and directed by Duane Clark and starring Zachary Throne.

Plot

Cast
Zachary Throne as Dean Carter
Bill Cobbs as Mr. Williams
Christine Cavanaugh as Anna Weisland
Debra Wilson as Jennifer Williams
C.J. Bau as Dean's Father
James Brown as himself

References

External links
 

American drama films
1990s English-language films
Films directed by Duane Clark
1990s American films
1997 drama films